Aleksandar Kozlina (20 December 1938 – 10 April 2013) was a Yugoslav footballer.

Club career
Kozlina started his professional career playing for Yugoslav powerhouse Hajduk Split in 1958. After spending four seasons at the club he was loaned out to FK Novi Sad for two seasons from 1962 to 1964. Upon his return he spent another four season with Hajduk before moving abroad and joining Belgian side RFC Liégeois in 1967. After leaving Liégeois he had spells with lower level sides Viktoria Köln, Fortuna Köln and Tilleur FC before retiring in 1974.

International career
Kozlina made his debut for Yugoslavia in a January 1960 friendly match away against Morocco and earned a total of 9 caps, scoring no goals. His final international was a December 1961 friendly away against Indonesia.He was a member of the squad which won gold medal at the 1960 Summer Olympics in Rome.

References

External links

Aleksandar Kozlina at the Serbia national football team website

1938 births
2013 deaths
People from Skrad
Association football midfielders
Yugoslav footballers
Yugoslavia international footballers
Footballers at the 1960 Summer Olympics
Olympic footballers of Yugoslavia
Olympic gold medalists for Yugoslavia
Medalists at the 1960 Summer Olympics
Olympic medalists in football
HNK Hajduk Split players
RFK Novi Sad 1921 players
RFC Liège players
FC Viktoria Köln players
SC Fortuna Köln players
R.F.C. Tilleur players
Yugoslav First League players
Belgian Pro League players
Yugoslav expatriate footballers
Expatriate footballers in West Germany
Yugoslav expatriate sportspeople in West Germany
Expatriate footballers in Belgium
Yugoslav expatriate sportspeople in Belgium